Fangs of Fate is a 1925 American silent Western film directed by Horace B. Carpenter and starring Bill Patton, Dorothy Donald, and Ivor McFadden.

Plot
As described in a film magazine review, outlaws terrorize the town of Arcady, Arizona. Bob Haynes, a stranger, is attracted by Azalia Bolton, daughter of a boarding house keeper, and protects her from some drunken rowdies. She inspires him to change his life to the better. Sheriff Dan Dodo Briggs offers to make Bob a deputy, but he declines. Later, following a stage coach holdup, he accepts the offered position and brings in the guilty bandits, but confesses that he used to be their leader. The outlaws are sent to jail, but Judge Harcourt paroles Bob into Azalia's custody.

Cast
 Bill Patton as Bob Haynes 
 Dorothy Donald as Azalia Bolton 
 Ivor McFadden as Sheriff Dan Dodo Briggs 
 Beatrice Allen as Azalia's Mother 
 William Bertram as Judge Harcourt 
 Merrill McCormick as 'Red Mack' - the Renegade 
 Karl Silvera as Lew Sontag
 Tex Starr as Bill (uncredited)
 Ted Wells as Man Who Reports Robbery (uncredited)

References

External links
 

1925 films
1925 Western (genre) films
Films directed by Horace B. Carpenter
Chesterfield Pictures films
American black-and-white films
Silent American Western (genre) films
1920s English-language films
1920s American films